The annual NCAA Division I Men's Ice Hockey Tournament is a college ice hockey tournament held in the United States by the National Collegiate Athletic Association (NCAA) to determine the top men's 
team in Division I. Like other Division I championships, it is the highest level of NCAA men's hockey competition. This tournament is somewhat unique among NCAA sports as many schools which otherwise compete in Division II or Division III compete in Division I for hockey.

Since 1999, the semi-finals and championship game of the tournament have been branded as the "Frozen Four"—a reference to the NCAA's long-time branding of its basketball semi-finals as the "Final Four".

History
The NCAA Men's Division I Ice Hockey Championship is a single elimination competition that has determined the collegiate national champion since the inaugural 1948 NCAA Men's Division I Ice Hockey Tournament. The tournament features 16 teams representing all six Division I conferences in the nation. The Championship Committee seeds the entire field from 1 to 16 within four regionals of 4 teams. The winners of the six Division I conference championships receive automatic bids to participate in the NCAA Championship. The tournament begins with initial games played at four regional sites culminating with the semi-finals and finals played at a single site.

In setting up the tournament, the Championship Committee seeks to ensure "competitive equity, financial success and likelihood of playoff-type atmosphere at each regional site." A team serving as the host of a regional is placed within that regional. The top four teams are assigned overall seeds and placed within the bracket such that the national semifinals will feature the No. 1 seed versus the No. 4 seed and the No. 2 seed versus the No. 3 seed should the top four teams win their respective regional finals. Number 1 seeds are also placed as close to their home site as possible, with the No. 1 seed receiving first preference. Conference matchups are avoided in the first round; should five or more teams from one conference make the tournament, this guideline may be disregarded in favor of preserving the bracket's integrity.

Broadmoor Ice Palace in Colorado Springs, Colorado hosted the tournament for the first ten years and has hosted eleven times overall, the most of any venue. Michigan and Denver Pioneers had won the most tournaments with nine, while Vic Heyliger has coached the most championship teams, winning six times with Michigan between 1948 and 1956.

The 2020 championship was cancelled due to the COVID-19 pandemic.

Tournament format history
1948–1976
 4 teams (1 game series)

1977–1980
 5–6 teams (1 game series)

1981–1987
 8 teams (2 game, total goals first round at higher seed)

1988
 12 teams (2 game, total goals first two rounds at higher seed)

1989–1991
 12 teams (best of 3 games first two rounds series at higher seed)

1992–2002
 12 teams (divided into 2 regionals, East Regional and West Regional; 6 teams each)

2003–present
 16 teams (divided into 4 regionals: Northeast, East, Midwest, and West Regionals: 4 teams each)

Results

 Participation in the tournament vacated by the NCAA Committee on Infractions.

Team titles

Performance by team

1948–1976
From 1948 through 1976, the NCAA Tournament included 4 teams, two from the Eastern Region and two from the Western Region.

The code in each cell represents the furthest the team made it in the respective tournament:
  Frozen Four
  National Runner-up
  National Champion

1977–2002
In 1977, changed the format to allow up to 4 additional teams as it saw fit. The NCAA selected 5 teams for the 1977, 1979, and 1980 tournaments, and 6 teams for the 1978 tournament. Starting in 1981, the NCAA selected 8 teams for the tournament every year, until 1988, when the field expanded to 12.

The code in each cell represents the furthest the team made it in the respective tournament:
  Round of 12 (starting in 1988)
  Quarterfinals (5 or 6 teams through 1980, 8 teams afterward)
  Frozen Four
  National Runner-up
  National Champion

2003–present
The field expanded to its current format of 16 teams in 2003. Note that the 2020 tournament was canceled due the COVID-19 pandemic before the announcement of the field.

The code in each cell represents the furthest the team made it in the respective tournament:
  First round
  Quarterfinals
  Frozen Four
  National Runner-up
  National Champion

Records

Points in a Championship Game

Points in Multiple Championships

Championship Hat Tricks

* Was not a member of the winning team.
† Natural hat-trick.
‡ Tournament participation later vacated.

Tournament Winning Percentage
Minimum 2 tournaments

Tournament Droughts
The following is a list of teams that have not made an NCAA tournament anytime in the last 10 seasons.

† Alaska's only appearance in 2010 was later vacated due to NCAA rules violations.
‡ St. Lawrence received an automatic bid in 2021, however, the team had to decline the invitation due to a positive COVID-19 test from their head coach.

Awards

At the conclusion of each tournament both an all-tournament team and 'Most Outstanding Player in Tournament' is named. Both achievements have been in effect since the inaugural championship in 1948

See also
NCAA Division II Men's Ice Hockey Championship 
NCAA Division III Men's Ice Hockey Championship
NCAA Women's Ice Hockey Tournament (National Collegiate division; de facto equivalent to Division I)

References